Synaphea stenoloba is a shrub endemic to Western Australia.

It blooms between August and October producing yellow flowers.

It is found on winter wet flats in a small area along the west coast in the Peel region of Western Australia where it grows in sandy-clay soils over granite.

References

Eudicots of Western Australia
stenoloba
Endemic flora of Western Australia
Plants described in 1995